Don't Stop is the first EP by English rock singer Billy Idol, released in 1981 by Chrysalis Records. 

The EP contains a version of Tommy James and the Shondells' UK No. 1 hit "Mony Mony", a live version of which would later become a hit for Idol in 1987. It also contains the song "Dancing with Myself", which had previously been a commercially unsuccessful single release for Idol's former band Gen X in the UK in 1980. "Dancing With Myself" (from that band's LP Kiss Me Deadly) was not re-recorded for the Don't Stop EP release but was remixed from Gen X's 6:05 minute long extended version of the song and edited down into 4:50 minutes, from which a drum solo and chorus section were removed. "Untouchables" is another Gen X song taken from the 1980 album Kiss Me Deadly, which was re-recorded for Don't Stop.

The EP peaked at No. 71 on the Billboard 200.

Track listing

The 1983 CD reissue of Don't Stop also includes a 12:50 length interview with Billy Idol by MTV VJ Martha Quinn. This interview was included on the cassette release as well.

Personnel
Musicians
As no musicians are credited on the album sleeve, credits are adapted from Idol's autobiography Dancing With Myself, except where noted.

Billy Idol – vocals
Aseley Otten – guitar 
Mick Smiley – bass 
Frankie Banali – drums 
Stephanie Spruill – backing vocals 
Steve New − guitar (track 4)
Steve Jones − guitar (track 4)
Danny Kustow − guitar (track 4)
Tony James – bass (track 4)
Terry Chimes – drums (track 4)

Technical
Keith Forsey – producer
Brian Reeves – engineer
Nigel Walker – engineer (track 4) 
Brian Aris – photography
Janet Levinson – design

References

Billy Idol EPs
1981 debut EPs
Albums produced by Keith Forsey
Chrysalis Records EPs

da:Don't Stop